Radial spoke head protein 4 homolog A, also known as radial spoke head-like protein 3, is a protein that in humans is encoded by the RSPH4A  gene.

Function 

TRadial spoke head protein 4 homolog A appears to be a component the radial spoke head, as determined by homology to similar proteins in the biflagellate alga Chlamydomonas reinhardtii and other ciliates. Radial spokes, which are regularly spaced along cilia, sperm, and flagella axonemes, consist of a thin 'stalk' and a bulbous 'head' that form a signal transduction scaffold between the central pair of microtubules and dynein.

Clinical significance 

Mutations in the RSPH4A gene are associated with primary ciliary dyskinesia.

References

Further reading

External links
 GeneReviews/NCBI/NIH/UW entry on Primary Ciliary Dyskinesia